Chicago Red Eleven was an American women’s soccer team, founded in 2005. The team was a member of the United Soccer Leagues W-League, the second tier of women’s soccer in the United States and Canada. The team played in the Midwest Division of the Central Conference. The team folded after the 2010 season.

History
Prior to the 2009 season they were known as the Chicago Gaels. The Gaels are not a continuation of the Chicago Cobras

Stadium
The team played its home games in the stadium on the campus of Benedictine University in the city of Lisle, Illinois, 27 miles west of downtown Chicago. The team's colors was red, white and pale blue.

Supporters

Owners
Ted Gradel was the owner and General Manager

Staff
Bonnie Young was the assistant GM
Head coach  David Nikolic (?–)
Assistant coach  Greg Muhr (?–)
Assistant coach  Robyn Serge (?–)
GK assistant coach  Dave Madsen (?–)

Players

Current roster

Year-by-year

2005

2006

2007

2008

Season detail 2009 
Teams in the conference Fort Wayne, Grand Rapids, Indianapolis, Kalamazoo Outrage, Medina, Minneapolis and the Chicago Red Stars.

Season detail 2010 
Teams in the conference Buffalo Flash, Kalamazoo Outrage, Medina, London Gryphons and the Chicago Red Stars.

2011 
Team Folded Operations

References

External links
Chicago Red Eleven official site
W-League official site

 
Sports in Cook County, Illinois
USL W-League (1995–2015) teams
Women's soccer clubs in Chicago
2005 establishments in Illinois
2010 disestablishments in Illinois
Association football clubs established in 2005
Association football clubs disestablished in 2010